"Pop Life" is a song by Prince and the Revolution. It was the second US (and final UK) single from their 1985 album, Around the World in a Day, reaching number 7 in the US charts, becoming Prince's eighth top-ten hit in a two-year span.

Production
The song starts with a faded-in synth line and quickly starts the main tune. The easy groove is achieved with a smooth bass guitar and piano embellishments. A drum machine provides handclaps to make the song danceable. "Pop Life" was recorded before Purple Rain was completed, indicating the new direction Prince wanted to take after the success of that album and film. Lyrically, the song describes the tiresome and stressful side of the celebrity life, including the pressure that can lead to drug use ("What you putting in your nose?/Is that where all your money goes?").

"Throw the bum out!"
The song includes a portion that features the sound of bell ringing for a boxing match, followed by the sound of a restless crowd with someone yelling "throw the bum out!" This was rumored to be taken from an actual concert in 1981 when Prince opened for the Rolling Stones in Los Angeles. Relatively unknown at the time, the crowd booed him off stage. He returned for the second show, getting a better reception, but with still some booing; Prince quit the tour shortly after. In reality, the bits are from a sound effects library; the same riot crowd sound effect can be heard in the 1982 horror film Alone in the Dark in the scene where a store is being looted (even the line "throw the bum out" can be heard at 35 minutes and 50 seconds into the movie). The reason for the sample's inclusion is unknown even to Prince himself; when asked about it on his online forum, Prince responded "Good ? - Me 2 :)" ("good question, me too :)").

Releases
The song was released in two extended versions. The UK 12" single version is a 9-minute extension of the tune, and ends with a similar synth sound as the beginning. The US received a "Fresh Dance Mix", which is a remix (by Sheila E.) that included some portions of the longer UK version. It clocks in at 6:16, and was included on the 2006 compilation album, Ultimate.

The US B-side of the track was "Hello", written quickly as a response to those who criticized Prince's lack of participation in the "We Are the World" event. The angry lyrics lambaste the prying media and false friendships, and is driven by a pulsing beat. The extended version of the song ends with a spoken word by Prince, which contain some self-humor about his high-heeled shoes. The UK B-side was "Girl", which the US had as the B-side of "America".

Elvis Costello once planned to do a cover version of the song, with altered lyrics, but Prince refused. Costello later recorded the song "The Bridge I Burned", which borrows the chord sequence from "Pop Life". Alternative rock band Local H recorded a cover of the song, but it has since gone unreleased.

Reception
Cash Box called it a "much more of a substantial offering — lyrically and musically — than [Prince's previous single] 'Raspberry Beret,'" saying that it "takes a look at the myths of the pop world and aspirations to that world."

Charts

References

Prince (musician) songs
Songs written by Prince (musician)
1985 singles
Paisley Park Records singles
Warner Records singles
Song recordings produced by Prince (musician)
1985 songs